John Brian Evans (9 November 1936 – 1 May 2011) played first-class and List A cricket for Glamorgan from 1958 to 1963. He also played Minor Counties and List A cricket for Lincolnshire from 1965 to 1971. He was born at Clydach, Glamorgan, Wales, and died at Grimsby, Lincolnshire, England.

References

External links

1936 births
2011 deaths
Welsh cricketers
Glamorgan cricketers
Lincolnshire cricketers
Minor Counties cricketers